Gustave Henry Mosler (June 16, 1875 – August 17, 1906), was a United States painter.

He was a pupil of his father, Henry Mosler, and of Léon Bonnat, exhibited at the Salon in Paris, receiving a medal for his "De Profundis" in 1891; his portrait of Governor J. W. Stewart is in the State House, Montpelier, Vermont, and his "Empty Cradle" is in the Toledo Art Club.

He died in Margaretville, New York.

Notes

References
 

1875 births
1906 deaths
19th-century American painters
19th-century American male artists
American male painters
20th-century American painters
20th-century American male artists